Bruno Correa Fernandes Caboclo (born September 21, 1995) is a Brazilian professional basketball player for Ratiopharm Ulm of the Basketball Bundesliga (BBL). He plays at the forward positions. 

After making his debut for Pinheiros in Brazil, Caboclo was drafted 20th overall in the 2014 NBA draft, whereafter he spent seven years in the National Basketball Association (NBA).

Early life
Born in Osasco, Brazil, Caboclo was raised in Barueri and Pirapora do Bom Jesus in the state of São Paulo. At age 13, he began playing basketball for Grêmio Recreativo Barueri, a social club that invites children from local public schools to play sports.

In January 2013, Caboclo linked up with coach Rafael Franco at Score Academy in Raleigh, North Carolina. In his first game, against top-five-ranked junior college Vincennes University, the  forward with an almost  wingspan missed three-pointer after three-pointer. Coach Franco told Caboclo he had to be aggressive and had to rebound, and the scoring would come, and was temporarily banned from shooting threes.

Professional career

Pinheiros (2013–2014)
In April 2013, Caboclo returned to Brazil and signed with Pinheiros of the Novo Basquete Brasil (NBB). In 2013–14, he played 17 games, averaging 4.8 points and 3.1 rebounds per game.

Toronto Raptors (2014–2018)
On June 26, 2014, Caboclo was selected with the 20th overall pick in the 2014 NBA draft by the Toronto Raptors. During draft night, it was infamously reported by Fran Fraschilla during Caboclo's selection that he was "two years away from being two years away." On July 9, 2014, he signed with the Raptors and joined them for the 2014 NBA Summer League. On November 21, 2014, he made his NBA debut against the Milwaukee Bucks. In 12 minutes of action, he recorded 8 points, 1 rebound and 1 block in the 124–83 win. On December 25, 2014, he was assigned to the Fort Wayne Mad Ants of the NBA Development League. He was recalled by the Raptors on January 1, 2015 after appearing in three games for the Mad Ants while averaging 4.3 points, 2.7 rebounds and 13.0 minutes per game. He was reassigned to the Mad Ants on February 18, and recalled again on March 8.

In July 2015, Caboclo re-joined the Raptors for the 2015 NBA Summer League. On September 29, 2015, the Raptors exercised their third-year team option on Caboclo's rookie scale contract, extending the contract through the 2016–17 season. During the 2015–16 and 2016–17 seasons, he had multiple assignments with Raptors 905 of the NBA Development League. In April 2017, Caboclo led Raptors 905 to the D-League Finals. In Game 3 of the series, Caboclo led the way with a game-high 31 points and 11 rebounds as Raptors 905 downed the Rio Grande Valley Vipers 122–96 to take the best-of-three series 2–1.

Sacramento Kings (2018)
On February 8, 2018, Caboclo was traded to the Sacramento Kings in exchange for Malachi Richardson. On March 23, he was assigned to the Reno Bighorns, Sacramento's G League affiliate and recalled two days later.

Rio Grande Valley Vipers (2018–2019)
On August 20, 2018, Caboclo signed a training camp contract with the Houston Rockets. He was waived on October 13. He was then added to the training camp roster of the Rockets’ G League affiliate, the Rio Grande Valley Vipers.

Memphis Grizzlies (2019–2020)
On January 24, 2019, Caboclo signed with the Memphis Grizzlies on a 10-day contract. On February 3, 2019, Caboclo signed a second 10-day contract. On February 13, 2019, Caboclo signed a multi-year contract with the Grizzlies. On March 25 he recorded his first double-double and scored a career high 24 points against the Oklahoma City Thunder. Caboclo was assigned to the Memphis Hustle on January 13, 2020.

Houston Rockets (2020–2021)
On February 6, 2020, Caboclo was traded to the Houston Rockets in exchange for Jordan Bell.

On January 13, 2021, Caboclo was waived by the Rockets.

Limoges CSP (2021)
On February 26, 2021 Limoges CSP officially announced signing Bruno Caboclo for the rest of the season. He averaged 10 points and 5 rebounds per game.

São Paulo FC (2021–2022)
On August 12, 2021, Caboclo signed with São Paulo FC of the Novo Basquete Brasil (NBB). He won the 2021–22 BCL Americas championship with São Paulo, the team's first continental title. Caboclo averaged 23.9 points and 11.1 rebounds, both second-best averages in the BCL Americas. He also led the competition in blocks per game, with 3.6, and efficiency with 32.8 per game. In the final on April 10, 2022, Caboclo had a team-high 29 points, 7 rebounds and 3 blocks. He was named the BCL Americas' season Most Valuable Player after the Tournament. Later, he was also named the MVP of the 2021–22 NBB season.

Following his successful year in Brazil, Caboclo participated in the 2022 NBA Summer League with the Utah Jazz.

On August 26, 2022, Caboclo signed with the Boston Celtics. He was waived on September 20.

Capitanes de Ciudad de México (2022)
On November 4, 2022, Caboclo was named to the opening night roster for the Capitanes de Ciudad de México of the NBA G League. He appeared in two games for the Capitanes, averaging 12 points and 5 rebounds.

Ratiopharm Ulm (2023–present) 
On January 5, 2023, Caboclo signed a multi-year deal with Ratiopharm Ulm of the German Basketball Bundesliga (BBL). He signed a contract until the end of 2024.

Career statistics

NBA

Regular season

|-
| style="text-align:left;"|
| style="text-align:left;"|Toronto
| 8 || 0 || 2.9 || .333 || .667 || .000 || .3 || .0 || .0 || .1 || 1.3
|-
| style="text-align:left;"|
| style="text-align:left;"|Toronto
| 6 || 1 || 7.2 || .083 || .143 || .000 || .3 || .2 || .3 || .2 || .5
|-
| style="text-align:left;"|
| style="text-align:left;"|Toronto
| 9 || 0 || 4.4 || .375 || .333 || .000 || 1.1 || .4 || .2 || .1 || 1.6
|-
| style="text-align:left;"|
| style="text-align:left;"|Toronto
| 2 || 0 || 3.5 || .000 || .000 || .000 || .5 || .5 || .5 || .0 || .0
|-
| style="text-align:left;"|
| style="text-align:left;"|Sacramento
| 10 || 0 || 10.0 || .310 || .200 || .833 || 2.1 || .3 || .2 || .4 || 2.6
|-
| style="text-align:left;"|
| style="text-align:left;"|Memphis
| 34 || 19 || 23.5 || .427 || .369 || .840 || 4.6 || 1.5 || .4 || 1.0 || 8.3
|-
| style="text-align:left;"|
| style="text-align:left;"|Memphis
| 22 || 0 || 8.7 || .406 || .160 || .667 || 2.0 || .5 || .5 || .5 || 2.8
|-
| style="text-align:left;"|
| style="text-align:left;"|Houston
| 8 || 0 || 6.5 || .500 || .250 || 1.000 || 2.0 || .2 || .6 || .6 || 3.5
|-
| style="text-align:left;"|
| style="text-align:left;"|Houston
| 6 || 0 || 6.0 || .471 || .000 || .500 || 2.3 || .2 || .0 || .3 || 2.8
|- class="sortbottom"
| style="text-align:center;" colspan="2"|Career
| 105 || 20 || 12.3 || .403 || .308 || .836 || 2.6 || .7 || .3 || .6 || 4.2

Playoffs

|-
| style="text-align:left;"|2020 
| style="text-align:left;"|Houston
| 2 || 0 || 3.5 || .500 || .000 || .000 || 1.5 || .0 || .5 || .0 || 1.0
|- class="sortbottom"
| style="text-align:center;" colspan="2"|Career
| 2 || 0 || 3.5 || .500 || .000 || .000 || 1.5 || .0 || .5 || .0 || 1.0

BCL Americas

|-
| style="text-align:left;background:#afe6ba;"| 2021–22†
| style="text-align:left;"|São Paulo
| 9 || 9 || style="background:#cfecec;"| 36.2* || style="background:#cfecec;"|.636* || .531 || .810 || 11.1 || 1.1 || 1.1 || style="background:#cfecec;"| 3.6* || 23.9
|-
|}

National team career
Caboclo has been a member of the senior Brazilian national basketball team. With Brazil, he played at the 2017 FIBA AmeriCup and at the 2019 FIBA Basketball World Cup.

References

External links

 FIBA Profile
 Bruno Caboclo at lnb.com.br

1995 births
Living people
2019 FIBA Basketball World Cup players
Brazilian expatriate basketball people in Canada
Brazilian expatriate basketball people in France
Brazilian expatriate basketball people in the United States
Brazilian men's basketball players
Capitanes de Ciudad de México players
Esporte Clube Pinheiros basketball players
Fort Wayne Mad Ants players
Houston Rockets players
Limoges CSP players
Memphis Grizzlies players
National Basketball Association players from Brazil
Novo Basquete Brasil players
People from Osasco
Raptors 905 players
Reno Bighorns players
Rio Grande Valley Vipers players
Sacramento Kings players
Small forwards
Toronto Raptors draft picks
Toronto Raptors players
São Paulo FC basketball players
Sportspeople from São Paulo (state)
Ratiopharm Ulm players
People from Barueri